Stephen Wild (born 26 April 1981) is an English former professional rugby league footballer who played in the 2000s and 2010s. 

Background
Wild was born in Wigan, Greater Manchester, England.

Playing career
Wild signed for Wigan Warriors from local amateurs Wigan St Patricks. He joined Wigan Warriors' first-team after progressing through the lower ranks at the club, making his début in 2001. He made his first representative appearance in 2002 for Lancashire. He was signed by Huddersfield Giants in 2006 and agreed a new contract keeping him at the club until 2009.

He has previously been compared to Nathan Hindmarsh, currently one of the sport's best players in Wild's position.
Wild played for Huddersfield Giants in the 2006 Challenge Cup Final at  against St. Helens but the Huddersfield Giants lost 12-42.
In June 2007 Wild was called up to the Great Britain squad for the test match against France, having made his début against Australia in 2004, he has also represented England against New Zealand, as well as Lancashire in Origin Series.

References

External links 
(archived by web.archive.org) Stephen Wild Giants Profile

1981 births
Living people
England national rugby league team players
English rugby league players
Great Britain national rugby league team players
Huddersfield Giants players
Lancashire rugby league team players
North Wales Crusaders players
Rugby league centres
Rugby league locks
Rugby league second-rows
Rugby league wingers
Salford Red Devils captains
Salford Red Devils players
Rugby league players from Wigan
Wigan St Patricks players
Wigan Warriors players